During the period of the Crusades, turcopoles (also "turcoples" or "turcopoli"; from the , literally "sons of Turks") were locally recruited mounted archers and light cavalry employed by the Byzantine Empire and the Crusader states. A leader of these auxiliaries was designated as Turcopolier, a title subsequently given to a senior officer in the Knights Templars and the Order of the Hospital of St John of Jerusalem, in charge of the coastal defences of Rhodes and Malta.

Byzantine origins 
The crusaders first encountered turcopoles in the Byzantine army during the First Crusade. These auxiliaries were from diverse Turkic origins; including Pechenegs, Oghuz Turks, Uzes, Cumans, and Bulgars. Some Byzantine turcopole units under the command of General Tatikios accompanied the First Crusade and may have provided a model for the subsequent employment of indigenous auxiliary light horse in the crusader states.

Composition 
It has been argued that, while turcopoles certainly included light cavalry and mounted archers, the term was a general one also applicable to indigenous Syrian footmen serving as feudal levies in the Kingdom of Jerusalem. Evidence that Syrian levies, whether designated as turcoples or not, provided the bulk of the Frankish led infantry of Outremer is not available but there are specific references to their participation in the Siege of Tripoli by Raymond de Saint-Gilles.

The turcopoles employed by the crusader states were not necessarily Turkish or mixed-race mercenaries, but many were probably recruited from Christianized Seljuqs, or from Syrian Eastern Orthodox Christians under crusader rule. By the second half of the 12th century the recorded names of individual turcoples indicate that some were Poulains (Syrian-born Franks), as well as European Franks. In addition to indigenous Christians and converted Turks, the turcopoles of Outremer may at various dates have included contingents from the west trained to serve as mounted archers.,.

Equipment 
In the Holy Land, turcopoles were more lightly equipped than the knights and sergeants (mounted men at arms), being armed with lances and bows to help combat the more mobile Muslim forces. The turcopoles served as light cavalry providing skirmishers, scouts, and mounted archers, and sometimes rode as a second line in a charge, to back up the Frankish knights and sergeants. Turcopoles had lighter and faster horses than the western mounted troops and wore much lighter armour. Usually this comprised only a quilted aketon or jerkin and a conical steel helmet. Regulations of the Hospitallers made a clear distinction between the heavy war saddles of the knights of the military order and the "Turkish saddles" issued to the Syrian turcoples who served with them.

Employment by military orders 
Turcopoles served in both the secular armies of Outremer and the ranks of the military orders. In the latter, turcopoles had lower status than the Frankish sergeants and were subject to various restrictions. These included having to eat at a separate table from the other mounted soldiers of the Templars or Hospitalers. In contrast to the unsalaried brother-knights and brother-sergeants of the fighting orders, turcopoles were paid warriors.

Funding 
A perennial problem for the Christian states of Outremer was the limited quantities of Frankish manpower, horses and weapons available. To a certain extent this weakness was redressed through the employment of locally recruited turcoples, riding indigenous horses and using the same equipment as their opponents. The cost of paying the mercenary element amongst the turcopoles was one of the specific reasons for repeated cash donations being sent to the crusader states from Europe.

Battle of Hattin 
At the decisive Battle of Hattin in 1187 the Historia Regni Hierosolymitani records 4,000 turcopoles as being part of the defeated Christian army. However the historian Steven Runciman considers this number exaggerated, and notes that the Muslem light cavalry present were probably better armed than the turcopoles. The turcopoles captured at Hattin were executed at Saladin's order, as having betrayed Islam.

Later history 
The Mamluks also considered turcopoles to be traitors and apostates, killing all those whom they captured. The turcopoles who survived the Fall of Acre followed the military orders out of the Holy Land and were established on Cyprus with the Knights Templar, plus Rhodes and Malta with the Knights Hospitaller. The Teutonic Order also called its own native light cavalry the "Turkopolen".

Turcopoliers and attendants 
The turcopoles had their own leaders called Turcopoliers who outranked ordinary sergeants, at least in battle. The senior office-holders of the Knights Templar included a Turcopolier who commanded both the mercenary cavalry recruited by the Order in the east and the sergeant-brothers. The personal attendants of the Grand Master of the Temple included a turcopole - possibly as an interpreter or orderly. The Hospitallers included in their rank-structure a Turcopolier, who originally was probably a sergeant-brother but who in 1303 was accorded the senior status of conventual bailli (official in the Central Convent). Francesco Balbi (1568) reports that the leader of the English 'Langue' of the Knights of St John was the order's Turcopolier; and was also in charge of the coastal defences of Rhodes and Malta.

See also
 Varangian Guard, another foreign mercenary force in the Byzantine Empire.

References

Further reading
Michael Haag, "The Templars: History and Myth", p. 158, Profile Books, London 2009. 
Jean Richard, "Les turcoples au service des royaumes de Jérusalem et de Chypre: musulmans convertis ou chrétiens orientaux?", in idem, Croisades et Etats latins d’Orient Points de vue et Documents (Aldershot, Ashgate, 1992) (Variorum Collected Studies Series: CS383),

Byzantine army
Cavalry
Crusades
People of the Crusades
Army reconnaissance units and formations